Henry Forbes may refer to:

 Henry Ogg Forbes (1851–1932), Scottish explorer
 Henry Forbes (composer) (1804–1859), pianist and composer
 Henry Flavelle Forbes (1877–1959), British civil servant

See also